Make Room is a Nigerian 2018 Hausa feature film showcasing the relationship between love and pursuit of dreams in the face of terrorism, directed by Robert Peters and produced by Rogers Ofime. The film features Kannywood actors and actresses such as Yakubu Muhammed, Sani Muazu, Rekiya Attah and Usman Uzee, supported by Adams Garba, Asabe Madake, Abba Zakky and Abubakar Maina.

Production
The film which was acted based on the insurgent activities  in Nigeria's Northeast featured about 3,000 day actors, 100 cast and 100 production crew members, and the shooting location was Ijebu - Miango, Bassa Local Government Area, Plateau State, Nigeria. The production took about 50 days to complete, costing an estimate of N200 to N300 million as production budget.

Plot
After being abducted along with 245 other girls from her school, the brilliant young Salma (Asabe Madaki), the only child of her parents aged 17 and the others were made to live with the terrorists in 
their camp. This brought about a disturbance to her dreams but she, however, despite the present conditions stayed true to her life ambition. Goni, one of the insurgents, comes along her way and the two fell in love and soon were married. As life gets difficult, with the encroachment of death and sorrow, insurgents and their lovers soon part ways.

Cast
 Asabe Madaki as Salma
 Sani Mu’azu as Salma's father
 Nadia Dutch as Dalia
 Uzee Usman
 Yakubu Muhammed
 Rekiya Attah
 Adams Garba
 Asabe Madake
 Abba Zakky
 Abubakar Maina
 Suji Jos
 Sadi Sawaba

Release
NMDb reported that the Hausa feature film was released in March 2018.

Accolades
The film was nominated at the 15th Africa Movie Academy Awards in 2019. Among the nominations it received were:

References

External links
 Make Room on NMDb

Nigerian drama films
2018 films